Bhuvaneshwari Kumari of Kota, Rajasthan is an Indian sportswomaand a champion in trap shooting.  She was awarded an Arjuna Award in 1969.  She was born in on 29 May 1945 at Bombay and married Thakur Devi Singh, of Malassar, in Bikaner.

Reference

Indian female sport shooters
1945 births
Living people
Rajasthani people
Recipients of the Arjuna Award
Sportswomen from Rajasthan
Trap and double trap shooters
People from Kota, Rajasthan
Shooters at the 1974 Asian Games
20th-century Indian women
20th-century Indian people
Asian Games competitors for India